The 5 January 2012 Iraq bombings were a series of attacks that hit the capital Baghdad and the southern city of Nasiriyah and appeared to target Shia Muslims. A suicide bomber attacked a security checkpoint as huge crowds of pilgrims were making the journey from Nasiriyah to Kerbala for a religious holiday. At least 44 people were killed and 81 more injured in the first significant attack in the city since a blast targeted the Italian military headquarters in November 2003.

Meanwhile, in Baghdad, at least three bombs exploded in Sadr City next to a group of day laborers waiting to get hired. Interior Ministry officials confirmed at least 13 died in these attacks and 32 were injured. Several hours later, two car bombs in the Kadhimiya district of Baghdad left 16 dead and 36 injured.

In addition to these attacks, two people were killed and six injured in a shooting and roadside bombing in the insurgent stronghold of Mosul. On 6 February 2012, the Islamic state of Iraq claimed responsibly for the attack.

See also

 List of terrorist incidents, January–June 2012

References 

2012 murders in Iraq
21st-century mass murder in Iraq
Bombings in the Iraqi insurgency
Terrorist incidents in Iraq in 2012
Mass murder in 2012
Shia–Sunni sectarian violence
Violence against Shia Muslims in Iraq
Islamic terrorist incidents in 2012
Spree shootings in Iraq
Suicide bombings in Iraq
Car and truck bombings in Iraq
2010s in Baghdad
Terrorist incidents in Baghdad
January 2012 events in Iraq